Sophia Edward Mwasikili (born 4 April 1986) is a Tanzanian footballer who plays as a defender and captains the Tanzania women's national team.

International career
Mwasikili capped for Tanzania at senior level during the 2018 Africa Women Cup of Nations qualification.

References

1986 births
Living people
Tanzanian women's footballers
Women's association football defenders
Tanzania women's international footballers